Adansonia za is a species of baobab in the genus Adansonia of the family Malvaceae (previously included in the Bombacaceae). Eight Adansonia species are recognized, with six endemic to Madagascar. Adansonia za is the most widespread of the Madagascar endemics.

Description
The trunk and branches have a brownish-rose colored hue. The tree is widest at the base, narrowing noticeably towards the top of the tree.

Leaves
Leaves are palmately lobed with 5 to 8 lobes per leaf. The leaf margin is entire (without teeth).

Flowers
The flower buds are long green cylinders which can resemble oversized beans and could be mistaken for a fruit. Flowers open with or soon after the leaves emerge at the beginning of the wet season. The bud opens with the curling back of the outside layer of the flower bud, revealing yellow and red petals with long, yellowish stamens. The flowers are musty-sweet scented. Flowering period extends from November to February. Flowers are usually pollinated by moths of the family Sphingidae including Coelonia solani, Coelonia brevis and Coelonia mauritii.

Fruits
They have a blackish, tough, thick outer shell (pericarp). They contain kidney-shaped, laterally-flattened seeds. The seeds have an oil content of 11 percent. In southern populations, the fruits have a markedly thickened peduncle, but this feature is less prominent in northern populations.

Distribution
Adansonia za is endemic to southern and north-western Madagascar. Populations are severely fragmented and numbers are declining due to habitat loss and logging.

Habitat
This plant grows in arid scrublands, in deciduous forests, savannah and in Madagascar spiny forests. It is the dominant tree in some of the southern deciduous forests, becoming less common to the north.

Largest tree
Possibly the largest tree of this species (by circumference) grows near Reakaly village north-west from Ampanihy.

Uses
The fruit pulp and roots of seedlings as well as the seeds are edible. Seeds contain 11% oil. Wood may be fed to cattle during droughts and the trunk can be hollowed out to store water. The bark fibre can be use for cloth or rope and the flowers may be used to sooth sore throats.

Gallery

References

Sources

External links

 Adansonia za
 Conservatoire et Jardin Botaniques Ville de Geneve

za
Endemic flora of Madagascar
Near threatened plants
Taxonomy articles created by Polbot
Plants described in 1890
Taxa named by Henri Ernest Baillon
Flora of the Madagascar dry deciduous forests
Flora of the Madagascar spiny thickets